Emmendingen (German: Landkreis Emmendingen) is a Landkreis (district) in the west of Baden-Württemberg, Germany. Neighbouring districts are (from north clockwise) Ortenaukreis, Schwarzwald-Baar, Breisgau-Hochschwarzwald and the district-free city Freiburg. To the west it borders the French département Bas-Rhin.

History
The district dates back to the Bezirksamt Emmendingen, which was created in 1803 when the area became part of Baden. After several additions it was converted into the district Emmendingen in 1936, when it was merged with the Amt Waldkirch. In the communal reform of 1973 the district wasn't changed - at first it was planned to merge it with the district Lahr, but that was merged into the Ortenaukreis instead.

Geography
The western part of the district is located in the upper Rhine valley, including the small volcanic mountain Kaiserstuhl. This extinct volcano is one of the climatic best regions of Germany, with wine grapes growing on its sunny slopes. The eastern part of the district belongs to the Black Forest.

Coat of arms
The left side of the coat of arms show the symbol of Baden. The six-topped mountain in the top right is the symbol of the Lords of Schwarzenberg, who ruled over the land around Elzach and Waldkirch; the wing in the bottom right is the symbol of the Lords of Üsenberg, who owned the land around Endingen, Herbolzheim and Kenzingen.

Cities and towns

References

External links

 Official website (German)
  Information about and images

 
Freiburg (region)
Districts of Baden-Württemberg